The Laz people in Georgia (Lazebi Sakartveloshi; , Lazepe Okorturaşe) refers to an indigenous Kartvelian-speaking ethnic group inhabiting the Black Sea coastal regions of Turkey and Georgia. There are about 2,000 Laz in Georgia, mainly in  Sarpi, Kvariati and Gonio villages and Batumi. Laz identity in Georgia has largely merged with a Georgian identity, and the meaning of "Laz" is seen as merely a regional category. Kolkhoba is an annual Laz festival held each year at the end of August or the beginning of September in Sarpi, a village in Georgia. Sopho Khalvashi was a first Georgian musician of Laz heritage who represented her home nation at the Eurovision Song Contest 2007.

Abkhazia

Mingrelia 
In Samegrelo and Zemo Svaneti region there are some Laz families in Anaklia village of Zugdidi Municipality and few in Poti city, where they highly assimilated with local Mingrelians.

References 

Laz people
People from Georgia (country) by ethnic or national origin